Guenée is a French surname. Notable people with the surname include:

 Achille Guenée (1809–1880), French lawyer and entomologist
 Antoine Guenée (1717–1803), French priest and Christian apologist

French-language surnames